Juan Soffici was an Argentine film editor. He was known for his work in the late 1930s and early 1940s for Lumiton.

Selected filmography
Cadetes de San Martín (1937)
La chismosa (1938)
 Three Argentines in Paris (1938)
Such Is Life (1939)
The Model and the Star  (1939)
Margarita, Armando y su padre (1939
Muchachas que estudian (1939)
 Isabelita (1940)
 Honeymoon in Rio (1940)
The Englishman of the Bones (1940)
Medio millón por una mujer (1940)
 I Want to Be a Chorus Girl (1941)
 You Are My Love (1941)
El tesoro de la isla Maciel (1941)
Persona honrada se necesita (1941)
Adolescencia (1942)

References

External links

Argentine film editors